Accursi is a surname. Notable people with the surname include:

Mike Accursi (born 1975), Canadian lacrosse player
Salvatore Accursi (born 1978), Italian footballer and manager
Taylor Accursi (born 1995), Canadian ice hockey player